The rink hockey World Club Championship is a worldwide competition with the best rink hockey teams. This competition was held for the first time in 2006, in Luanda, Angola.

The budget for the competition in 2006 was 1 million US dollars. The winner earned a 5000 euro prize, the 2nd-placed, 2500 euro and the 3rd-placed 1250.  Every team received a trophy and the 4th to the 12th placed teams equal ones. The top scorer was Luís Viana, a Portuguese player of Bassano, who scored 13 goals.

Format
12 teams from 8 different countries participate. The teams are divided into 4 groups of three teams each. The top teams of each group will advance to the final stage into a round-robin group to decide which team is the champion. The teams that didn't advance to the final stage will play knockout rounds to determine the 5th to 12th placed teams.

Teams participating
Africa:

 Juventude de Viana
 Petro Atlético
 Desportivo de Maputo

Europe:

 FC Porto
 SL Benfica
 Bassano
 Lodi
 Reus

South America:

 Sertãozinho
 Concepción
 Olimpia de San Juan
 Estudantil S. Miguel

Group stage
All times West Africa Time / Western European Time (only during DST)

Group A

Group B

Group C

Group D

Final phase

5th to 12th places

First round

Second round

Third round

Final table

References

External links
 2006 World Club Championship Official Site

2006 in roller hockey
Rink hockey World Club Championship
2008 in Angolan sport
International roller hockey competitions hosted by Angola